Jules Mahieu (23 April 1884 – 7 February 1962) was a French sports shooter. He competed in two events at the 1924 Summer Olympics.

References

External links
 

1884 births
1962 deaths
French male sport shooters
Olympic shooters of France
Shooters at the 1924 Summer Olympics
Sportspeople from Nord (French department)